Draped Up & Chipped Out, Vol. 2 is a compilation album by the American rapper Messy Marv, released on November 6, 2007. It peaked at #77 on the R&B/Hip-Hop Albums chart, #33 on the Heatseekers Albums chart, #1 on the Top Heatseekers Pacific chart, and #8 on the Top Heatseekers West North Central chart. It is the second album of his Draped Up & Chipped Out series and includes performances by B-Legit & Mistah F.A.B., as well as guest appearances from Sean Paul,  Juvenile, Mike Jones and Mac Dre, among others. Draped Up & Chipped Out, Vol. 2 was released shortly after Messy Marv's release from a year-long prison sentence on weapons charges (hence the name of the album series).

Track listing

References

2007 albums
Messy Marv albums
SMC Recordings albums
Sequel albums